Leggo is an Italian newspaper and was the first free daily newspaper published in Italy.

History and profile
Leggo was established by Caltagirone Editore, owned by Francesco Gaetano Caltagirone, in 2001.

It publishes 15 local editions for the cities of Rome, Milan, Turin, Naples, Bologna, Florence, Padua, Venice, Verona, Bari, Genoa, Como, Bergamo, Brescia and Varese, with a total circulation of 1,050,000 copies.

In the period of 2001-2002 Leggo had a circulation of 715,000 copies.

References

External links
 Official website 

2001 establishments in Italy
Publications established in 2001
Free daily newspapers
Italian-language newspapers
Newspapers published in Milan
Newspapers published in Turin
Newspapers published in Rome
Newspapers published in Naples
Newspapers published in Florence
Mass media in Genoa
Daily newspapers published in Italy